Lawrence Eisenberg (December 21, 1919 – December 25, 2018) was an American biomedical engineer and science fiction writer. He is best known for his short story "What Happened to Auguste Clarot?", published in Harlan Ellison's anthology Dangerous Visions. Eisenberg's stories have also been printed in a number of leading science fiction magazines, including The Magazine of Fantasy & Science Fiction, Galaxy Science Fiction, and Asimov's Science Fiction. His stories have been reprinted in anthologies such as Great Science Fiction of the 20th Century, The 10th Annual of the Year’s Best S-F, and Great Science Fiction By the World's Great Scientists. He is also known for the limericks he posted in the comments sections of various articles in The New York Times.

Life 
Eisenberg was born in New York City in 1919 to Sidney Eisenberg, a furniture salesman, and Yetta Yellen, and grew up in the Bronx during the Great Depression. Eisenberg graduated from James Monroe High School in the Bronx, then attended City College of New York before going to Polytechnic Institute of Brooklyn, where he received his Ph.D. in Electronics.  After serving as a radar operator in the Army Air Forces during World War II, Eisenberg married Frances Brenner, a political scientist and social worker, in 1950; she died in 2017. They had one daughter and one son. The couple had lived for many years on the Upper East Side of Manhattan, but by the time of Eisenberg's death he had been living in Somerville, Massachusetts. His death on December 25, 2018, was reported by The New York Times under the headline, "Larry Eisenberg, 99, Dead; His Limericks Were Very Well Read". His daughter, Beth Eisenberg, told the Times he died in a hospice in Lincoln, Massachusetts, of complications of acute myeloid leukemia.

Eisenberg was for many years a biomedical engineer at Rockefeller University, where he and Dr. Robert Schoenfeld were co-heads of the Electronics Laboratory, and taught there until 2000. He designed the first transistorized radio-frequency coupled cardiac pacemaker circa 1960, in collaboration with Dr. Alexander Mauro. It is on display at Caspary Hall, Rockefeller University.

Meet Larry Eisenberg, a feature-length documentary about Eisenberg's life, is in production.

Writing 
Eisenberg published his first short story, "Dr. Beltzov's Polyunsaturated Kasha Oil Diet", in Harper's Magazine in 1962. His first science fiction publication was later that year with his story "The Mynah Matter" in the August 1962 Fantastic Stories of Imagination, with Eisenberg debuting alongside Roger Zelazny.

Shortly after that, Eisenberg began publishing his stories in many of the leading science fiction magazines of the day, including The Magazine of Fantasy & Science Fiction, Galaxy Science Fiction, and If. Eisenberg's science fiction takes a humorous approach to storytelling. As Eisenberg has said, "I enjoy wedding humor with science fiction, particularly where some unsavory aspect of our society can be pricked."

Many of Eisenberg's stories feature his character Professor Emmet Duckworth, a research scientist and two-time winner of the Nobel Prize. Duckworth's "bright ideas seem great at first but always end in disaster" with one of the professor's many inventions being "an addictive aphrodisiac clocking in at 150,000 calories per ounce —along with a propensity to turn those taking it into walking bombs." A number of the Duckworth stories were collected in Eisenberg's short story collection, The Best Laid Schemes, published in 1971 by MacMillan.
 
Eisenberg is best known for his short story "What Happened to Auguste Clarot?," which was published in the anthology Dangerous Visions edited by Harlan Ellison. His stories have also been reprinted in anthologies such as Great Science Fiction of the 20th Century, The 10th Annual of the Year’s Best SF, and Great Science Fiction By the World's Great Scientists.

He published two books of limericks (both with George Gordon) in 1965: Limericks for the Loo and Limericks for Lantzmen; and one collection of short stories, Best Laid Schemes. Latterly he gained a cult following for the limericks he posted in the comments sections of various New York Times articles and was referred to as the "closest thing this paper has to a poet in residence".

Eisenberg wrote the following limerick about his life
A nonagenarian, I,
A sometime writer of sci-fi,
Biomed engineer,
Gen’rally of good cheer,
With lim’ricks in ready supply.

From a New York Times reader: "The Eisenberg Certainty Principle":
There once was a poet named Larry
Whose thoughts one could never quite parry
For when Larry had spoken
The mold it was broken
Though the topics invariably vary.

Bibliography

Short story collection
 The Best Laid Schemes, MacMillan, New York, 1971.

Limericks and other books
 Limericks for Lantzmen (1965) with George Gordon.
 Limericks for the Loo (July 1966) with George Gordon.
 Games People Shouldn't Play (November 1966) with George Gordon.

Selected short fiction

References

External links

1919 births
2018 deaths
Writers from New York City
Military personnel from New York City
American biomedical engineers
City College of New York alumni
Polytechnic Institute of New York University alumni
Rockefeller University people
American male novelists
American male short story writers
Jewish American novelists
American science fiction writers
American short story writers
Deaths from acute myeloid leukemia
Deaths from cancer in Massachusetts
James Monroe High School (New York City) alumni